Blank Project is the fourth studio album by Neneh Cherry, released by Smalltown Supersound on 25 February 2014. The record is Cherry's first album of solo music in 18 years. It was recorded and mixed over a 5-day period in Woodstock, NY. It was produced by Four Tet's Kieran Hebden and features a guest appearance by Robyn. The record also includes work with prior collaborators, synth/drum duo RocketNumberNine. Critical reviews of the album were very positive.

Description 
Cherry wrote the material as a way to mourn for her mother, who died in 2009. The record is a departure from her previous work, consisting of a more sparse sound, with loose drums and a few synthesizers as the only accompaniment to her voice. RocketNumberNine provides industrial beats.

Critical reception 

Blank Project received widespread critical acclaim upon its release. At Metacritic, which assigns a normalized rating out of 100 to reviews from mainstream critics, the album has received an average score of 82, based on 36 reviews, indicating "universal acclaim". NPR calls the work "stark and urgent, almost entirely percussive. Her lyrics are less rebel treatises than koans or ruminations." Spin says it is "a stark, bracing, and emotionally vulnerable album that straddles the jazz, pop, and electronic worlds rather brilliantly." The Guardian calls it "a bold and adventurous album".

The Arts Desk describes the record: "High on rhythms and percussion and low on conventional melodies, it certainly isn’t easy listening but is frequently bold and challenging, with harsh electronica providing the only accompaniment to Neneh’s warm vocals." The Skinny calls Blank Project a "triumph."

Electronic Beats says: "Blank Project is an upturned bag on a table, pouring out its contents for anyone to sort through: chewed up emotions, snotty little insecurities and the kind of anxiety that’ll etch red marks into the skin if you carry it around too long."

In Vice, Robert Christgau gave the album a one-star honorable mention, naming "Out of the Black" and "Spit Three Times" as highlights, while writing, "long-ago hipster-funk ingénue reclaims her avant-garde roots".

Track listing

Bonus tracks 
 Rough Trade / Piccadilly Records:
 CD version: Bonus CD
 LP version: Double LP with CD of album and bonus CD

Bonus CD 
The Blank Project - Bonus Remix Disc (available via Rough Trade Records and Piccadilly Records 
 "Everything" (Radio Edit)
 "Out of the Black" (featuring Robyn) (Joe Goddard Extended Version)
 "Everything" (Villalobos & Loderbauer: Vilod Low Blood Pressure Mix)
 "Out of the Black" (featuring Robyn) (Bouvet Remix)

Personnel 
 Neneh Cherry - vocals
 Robyn - vocals on "Out of the Black"
 RocketNumberNine - music
 Producer – Four Tet

Charts

References

External links 
 NenehCherry.com (official site)

2014 albums
Neneh Cherry albums
Albums produced by Kieran Hebden
Smalltown Supersound albums